Helluva Good Luck 2 is a 2001 Czech fantasy film directed by Zdeněk Troška. It is a sequel to Helluva Good Luck. The film stars Michaela Kuklová and Miroslav Šimůnek. Karel Gott appeared in a supporting role as Lucifer and God.

Cast
 Michaela Kuklová as Markéta
 Miroslav Šimůnek as Jan
 Vladimír Brabec as King
 Daniel Hůlka as Brambas
 Sabina Laurinová as Princess Eufrozína
 Dana Morávková as Dora
 Lukáš Vaculík as Kujbaba
 Karel Gott as Lucifer and God
 Radoslav Brzobohatý as Markéta's father
 Milena Dvorská as Jan's Mother

References

External links 
 

2000s fantasy adventure films
Films about dragons
Czech fantasy adventure films
Dragons in popular culture
Czech sequel films
Films based on fairy tales
2000s Czech-language films
2000s Czech films
Films directed by Zdeněk Troška